Basiothia is a genus of moths in the family Sphingidae first described by Francis Walker in 1859.

Species
Basiothia aureata (Karsch, 1891)
Basiothia charis (Walker, 1856)
Basiothia laticornis (Butler, 1879)
Basiothia medea (Fabricius, 1781)
Basiothia schenki (Moschler, 1872)

References

 
Macroglossini
Moth genera
Taxa named by Francis Walker (entomologist)